Slave Dimitrov (born June 1, 1946) is a Macedonian composer, singer and record producer. He composed and sang "Chija si" (Чија си), labeled as the "song of the millennium" in the Republic of Macedonia.

References

1946 births
Living people
20th-century Macedonian male singers
Macedonian pop singers
People from Bitola